The 2000 Baltimore Orioles season involved the Orioles finishing 4th in the American League East with a record of 74 wins and 88 losses.

Offseason
December 7, 1999: Doug Linton was released by the Baltimore Orioles.
December 10, 1999: Jesse Orosco was traded by the Baltimore Orioles to the New York Mets for Chuck McElroy.
December 22, 1999: Buddy Groom was signed as a free agent with the Baltimore Orioles.

Regular season
Cal Ripken Jr.'s 1999 season ended early due to injury when he was only 9 hits away from joining the 3,000 hit club. He finally achieved the milestone early in the 2000 season when he singled off reliever Héctor Carrasco in a game against the Minnesota Twins on April 15, 2000, in the Metrodome. Ripken had a good night at the plate, getting three hits, the third of which was the milestone.  The Twins distributed a commemorative certificate to the fans as they left the Metrodome after the game.
On October 1, 2000, Albert Belle hit a home run in the last at-bat of his career.

Season standings

Record vs. opponents

Notable transactions
 July 28, 2000: Mike Bordick was traded by the Baltimore Orioles to the New York Mets for Lesli Brea, Mike Kinkade, Melvin Mora, and Pat Gorman (minors).
 July 28, 2000: Rich Amaral was released by the Baltimore Orioles.
 July 29, 2000: Charles Johnson was traded by the Baltimore Orioles with Harold Baines to the Chicago White Sox for Brook Fordyce, Jason Lakman (minors), Juan Figueroa (minors), and Miguel Felix (minors).
 July 31, 2000: Will Clark was traded by the Baltimore Orioles with cash to the St. Louis Cardinals for José León.
 July 31, 2000: B. J. Surhoff was traded by the Baltimore Orioles with Gabe Molina to the Atlanta Braves for Trenidad Hubbard, Fernando Lunar, and Luis Rivera.

Roster

Player stats

Batting

Starters by position 
Note: Pos = Position; G = Games played; AB = At bats; H = Hits; Avg. = Batting average; HR = Home runs; RBI = Runs batted in

Other batters 
Note: G = Games played; AB = At bats; H = Hits; Avg. = Batting average; HR = Home runs; RBI = Runs batted in

Pitching

Starting pitchers 
Note: G = Games pitched; IP = Innings pitched; W = Wins; L = Losses; ERA = Earned run average; SO = Strikeouts

Other pitchers 
Note: G = Games pitched; IP = Innings pitched; W = Wins; L = Losses; ERA = Earned run average; SO = Strikeouts

Relief pitchers 
Note: G = Games pitched; W = Wins; L = Losses; SV = Saves; ERA = Earned run average; SO = Strikeouts

Farm system
LEAGUE CHAMPIONS: Delmarva

Awards and records
 Albert Belle, American League record, Most RBIs in the final season of a career (103)

References

External links 
2000 Baltimore Orioles team at Baseball-Reference
2000 Baltimore Orioles season at Baseball Almanac

Baltimore Orioles seasons
Baltimore Orioles season
Baltimore